Timothy Theriault is an American politician. He serves as a Republican member for the 79th district of the Maine House of Representatives.

In 2014, Theriault was elected to represent the 79th district in the Maine House of Representatives. He succeeded Sharon Treat. Theriault assumed his office on December 3, 2014.

References 

Living people
Place of birth missing (living people)
Year of birth missing (living people)
Republican Party members of the Maine House of Representatives
21st-century American politicians